Tapanui is a small town in West Otago in New Zealand's South Island, close to the boundary with Southland region.

It is a forestry town at the foot of the Blue Mountains and the Pomahaka River. Popular pastimes include deer stalking and trout fishing.

Nearby locations include Landslip Hill, a fossil-bearing geologic feature.

History

For almost a hundred years, the town was serviced by the Tapanui Branch railway line, which despite its name never actually terminated in Tapanui. This line was formally opened in late 1880 and closed after being damaged by severe flooding in the region in October 1978.

In 2015, Tapanui was a filming location for the Disney production Pete's Dragon, with the main street and old timber mill serving as their equivalents in the fictional town of Millhaven.

Tapanui flu
In New Zealand the name Tapanui is closely associated with the mysterious ailment chronic fatigue syndrome, which — until it became an accepted ailment — was known as "Tapanui 'flu". The doctor who first documented the rise of the condition in New Zealand, Peter Snow, was based in the town.

Demographics
Tapanui is described by Statistics New Zealand as a rural settlement.

Tapanui had a population of 789 at the 2018 New Zealand census, an increase of 66 people (9.1%) since the 2013 census, and an increase of 45 people (6.0%) since the 2006 census. There were 351 households. There were 381 males and 399 females, giving a sex ratio of 0.95 males per female, with 135 people (17.1%) aged under 15 years, 93 (11.8%) aged 15 to 29, 336 (42.6%) aged 30 to 64, and 219 (27.8%) aged 65 or older.

Ethnicities were 89.7% European/Pākehā, 14.8% Māori, 0.4% Pacific peoples, 1.5% Asian, and 3.4% other ethnicities (totals add to more than 100% since people could identify with multiple ethnicities).

Although some people objected to giving their religion, 51.0% had no religion, 38.4% were Christian, 0.8% were Hindu, 0.8% were Muslim, 0.8% were Buddhist and 1.1% had other religions.

Of those at least 15 years old, 63 (9.6%) people had a bachelor or higher degree, and 180 (27.5%) people had no formal qualifications. The employment status of those at least 15 was that 279 (42.7%) people were employed full-time, 114 (17.4%) were part-time, and 15 (2.3%) were unemployed.

Education

The school was established in 1868, became Tapanui District High School in 1902, and split into the current school and Blue Mountain College in 1976.

References

Clutha District
Populated places in Otago